HMCS Prince Robert was the first of three refrigerated passenger and cargo ships constructed at Birkenhead for Canadian National for operation along the British Columbia Coast during the 1930s. The ship's arrival during the Great Depression led to the vessel's financial failure and by 1935, the ship was in limited use. With the onset of World War II, the Royal Canadian Navy acquired the vessel for use as an armed merchant cruiser for protection of western coast of Canada. Upon completion, Prince Robert and her sister ships were the most powerful ships operated by the Canadians until the arrival of larger cruisers later in the war. Converted at Esquimalt, British Columbia and commissioned into the Royal Canadian Navy in September 1941, Prince Robert saw its first action along the Mexican coast, capturing the German freighter Weser later that month. Prince Robert then continued patrolling along the Pacific coast of North America, then being sent to Australia to escort troop convoys across the Pacific.

As the threat along the Pacific coast of Canada diminished, a new role for Prince Robert and it was converted to an anti-aircraft cruiser in 1943. Prince Robert returned to service later that year and escorted convoys in the Atlantic Ocean and Mediterranean Sea between the United Kingdom and Naples, Italy, defending them against air attack. In 1944, the ship was transferred to the Pacific once again and was at Sydney, Australia when Japan surrendered. Prince Robert was ordered to Hong Kong to repatriate Canadian prisoners of war and to assist in control of the island. The ship returned to Canada on 20 October 1945 and was paid off on 10 December and transferred to War Assets Corporation for disposal.

The ship was sold to private buyers who returned the vessel to the cargo/passenger trade as Charlton Sovereign in 1948. Charlton Sovereign transported displaced persons and refugees from Europe to locations in Central and South America. In 1951, the ship was sold again and renamed Lucania. Lucania was used a passenger ship between Italy and Venezuela until 1962, when the vessel was sold for scrap.

Design and description

Three passenger/cargo ships were ordered by Canadian National from Cammell Laird for construction in the United Kingdom. The vessel's draught was  aft. Prince Robert displaced  and had a gross register tonnage (GRT) of 6,893 tons and a net register tonnage (NRT) of 3,072 tons.

These were powered by six water-tube, five-drum, super-heated main boilers and two three-burner Scotch marine boilers for auxiliary power.

The ship had a refrigerated cargo capacity forward and could had accommodation for 334 first class passengers and 70 third class. They could carry 1,500 passengers on day trips. The ship had three decks and an elevator that could move up to two automobiles between them. Prince Robert had an open bridge placed in front of a small, enclosed wheelhouse. The vessel had three funnels and was equipped with six lifeboats per side. Two booms were situated forward over the no. 1 hold. To allow access to jetties of different heights, shell doors were located on each deck.

Problems with the design arose after entering service. Their high sides and lack of maneuverability led to them requiring tugboat assistance when entering smaller harbours. Their speed created a tremendous wash that damaged the sea walls in West Vancouver, British Columbia.

Service history

Construction and early civilian service
In 1928, the president of Canadian National, Sir Henry Thornton, announced orders for three luxury liners for service on the Pacific coast as part of the effort to re-establish the tri-city route between Vancouver and Victoria, British Columbia and Seattle, Washington and to create a new market for Alaskan cruises. Prince Robert was ordered in 1929 by Canadian National for construction by Cammell Laird at their shipyard in Birkenhead with the yard number 966. Prince Robert was completed in August 1930 and sailed for the British Columbia Coast. However, Prince Robert was forced to return to Birkenhead after the vessel developed engine troubles. The ship did not enter service until May 1931 and began sailing on the tri-city routes. In July 1931, Prince Robert ran aground near Port Townsend, Washington and was withdrawn from service. By 5 September 1931, the tri-city service was ended and Prince Robert spent most of its time laid up in Vancouver.

In 1932 the ship was chartered for extended cruises from Boston, Massachusetts and New York City to destinations such as Bermuda, ports in South America and Hawaii. It was not until 1935 that Prince Robert began seeing more regular service when the ship began to make 11-day cruises to Skagway, Alaska. The 11-day cruises began in Vancouver, stopping in Prince Rupert, British Columbia,  Sitka, Ketchikan and Juneau, Alaska, before arriving at Skagway. From November through February each year, Skagway froze over during winter and Prince Robert was laid up for overhaul. The three sister ships were considered economic failures for Canadian National, with their arrival coinciding with the Great Depression. Their failure was one of the contributing factors in the resignation of the president of Canadian National, Sir Henry Thornton. The ships were expensive to operate and did not generate new business. In mid-1939, Prince Robert was chosen to act as a royal yacht during the visit of King George VI and Queen Elizabeth to British Columbia. They embarked aboard Prince Robert at Vancouver and were accompanied by a naval escort to their disembarkation site at Victoria.

Conversion

Prior to the outbreak of World War II, the Royal Canadian Navy offered to the British Royal Navy to convert vessels for their own armed merchant cruisers if they were provided with the armaments. The offer was accepted and the Royal Canadian Navy looked around for ships for possible conversion. Though the "Princes" were made available, Prince Robert and its sister ships were initially rejected due to their poor range, limited water supply and low top speed. However, after the outbreak of war, there was a shortage of cruisers and destroyers to deter surface raiders, and the conversion of the three vessels was incorporated in the 1939 Shipbuilding Programme. The British Admiralty advised that only two of the ships be converted. Prince Robert was one of the two initially chosen. Though intended only for chartering by the Royal Canadian Navy, it was later decided to purchase the vessels outright with Prince Robert acquired for $700,000 in November 1939.

The design of the conversion was laid out by the naval architecture firm Lambert, German & Milne of Montreal and work on Prince Robert began on 9 February 1940 at Burrard Dry Dock, Esquimalt, British Columbia with an expected delivery in July. The conversion cost $755,330 and included the trunking of the three funnels into two shorter ones, the installation of four breech-loading  Mk VII guns, one on each of the two decks forward and aft. The 6-inch guns had once been provided by the Royal Navy and had once been part of the armament of the s. Two  guns were fitted on the upper deck amidships along with light anti-aircraft (AA) machine guns. Two depth charge chutes were placed over the stern, though no anti-submarine warfare (ASW) detection equipment was provided. Prince Roberts complement was 241 officers and ratings.

Royal Canadian Navy service
The threat of German surface raiders along the Pacific Coast forced the Royal Canadian Navy to speed up the conversion. When the conversion was completed, Prince Robert resembled the s and were the most powerful vessels in the Canadian fleet until the arrival of larger ships later in the war. Prince Robert was commissioned on 31 July 1940 at Vancouver and was ready for sea trials in September. The Royal Canadian Navy had hoped to keep Prince Robert in Canadian waters as protection for west coast Canadian ports. The British Commander-in-Chief of the America and West Indies Station sought to use Prince Robert along the South American coast to disrupt enemy shipping and it was the latter's plan that became Prince Roberts mission. On 11 September, Prince Robert departed Esquimalt for one day of gunnery trials before sailing south to reinforce the Allied blockade of German ships in South American ports.

Prince Robert arrived off Manzanillo, Mexico on 18 September and patrolled the entrance to the harbour. Within the port, the 9,472-ton German merchant vessel  was known to be getting ready to sail. On 25 September Weser was spotted departing Manzanillo after dark. The commander of Prince Robert waited until Weser had exited the harbour mouth before placing his ship between Weser and the port, cutting off the German vessel's retreat. Prince Robert followed Weser out to international waters remaining undetected, with the Germans thinking that Prince Robert just another Mexican patrol vessel. Prince Robert moved to seize the German vessel after crossing into international waters, taking the Germans by surprise. The Canadian ship sent a boarding party which was able to prevent the German ship from being scuttled and captured Weser. Prince Robert and Weser then sailed for Esquimalt, where the former German ship was taken into Allied service.

Prince Robert returned to patrolling off the west coast of South and Central America until early February 1941 when the armed merchant cruiser was replaced by a British cruiser. Prince Robert was then redirected to escort Australian troop convoys across the Pacific for the seven months, spending September and October in refit at Esquimalt. In November, Prince Robert escorted the troop transport  that carried C Force to Hong Kong. C Force was the Canadian contingent for the garrison of Hong Kong. Prince Robert transported 109 members of the Royal Rifles of Canada to Hong Kong. Prince Robert and Awatea arrived at Hong Kong on 16 November and disembarked their troops. On 19 November, Prince Robert sailed for Manila, Philippines, arriving two days later to refuel and replenish before sailing again for home. Prince Robert paused at Pearl Harbor, Hawaii before sailing for Esquimalt on 4 December. Prince Robert was ordered to the area to search but found nothing. The armed merchant cruiser arrived at Esquimalt on 10 December. Rumours that Prince Robert had spotted the Japanese fleet that attacked Pearl Harbor on 7 December, were denied and proven to be false.

After returning to Canada, Prince Robert resumed patrols along the coastal shipping lanes as part of Esquimalt Force. This was done to provide a visual presence of the Royal Canadian Navy and to satisfy the American demand for a credible Canadian naval presence. By May 1942 the ship was overhauled at Esquimalt, receiving plastic bridge armour, ASDIC for ASW detection, and  cannon for AA protection. In June the Royal Canadian Navy was informed of the upcoming Aleutian Islands Campaign by the United States. Beginning in May, Prince Robert was placed under Royal Navy control as an escort and patrol ship attached to the New Zealand Station. Force D arrived at Kodiak on 20 August and were placed in Task Force 8. Prince Robert was primarily deployed to escort convoys between Kodiak and Dutch Harbor, each trip taking roughly seven days followed by a four-day maintenance period. The first convoy Prince Robert sailed with nearly led to an incident. On 27 August, the convoy encountered unknown ships crossing their path. They belonged to another convoy, but this information had not been passed to Prince Roberts commander. As tensions mounted after attempts to communicate failed, a US destroyer moved to intercept the ships and ascertain their identity, which resolved the situation.

As anti-aircraft cruiser
As the war progressed, the "Princes" deficiencies as armed merchant cruisers and the need for newer ship types led to the decision to convert the three ships. Prince Robert was chosen for conversion to an auxiliary AA cruiser for use in air defence for convoys. Prince Robert was taken out of service on 2 January 1943 and converted. The ship's armament was completely changed. The cruiser's main armament consisted of ten quick-firing  Mk XVI high-angle/low-angle dual-purpose guns in five twin turrets. Furthermore, the ship was given eight 2-pdr (40mm) "pom-poms" in two quadruple mounts and twelve 20 mm Oerlikon cannon. Prince Robert was also given four depth charge throwers. With the conversion, Prince Robert became one of the more powerful AA ships in the war. The ship recommissioned on 7 June 1943 at Vancouver and on 19 June, departed for the River Clyde, via the Panama Canal and Bermuda. While stopped at Bermuda, the vessel's gunnery systems were modified.

On 20 October, Prince Robert was ready for active service, and the following day sailed to join the Mediterranean Fleet to be used as an AA escort for convoys operating between the United Kingdom and Sierra Leone and convoys in the Mediterranean Sea. On 21 November, Prince Robert joined the escort of the joint convoy SL 139/MKS 30. The convoy had previously survived a concerted U-boat assault and the day Prince Robert joined the escort screen, the convoy came under air attack. The Luftwaffe had sent 25 Heinkel He 177 bombers to attack the convoy with glide bombs. During the air assault, one merchant ship was sunk and another damaged. Two German aircraft were shot down. While supporting convoys travelling to Naples, Italy, the ship was tied into the local AA defence of the harbours it was docked in by telephone. In January 1944, Prince Robert was reassigned to Plymouth Command but remained as AA support for convoys travelling to the Mediterranean. After escorting 17 convoys, Prince Robert was withdrawn from European waters in September as the German air threat diminished and transferred once again to the Pacific. Prince Robert departed Plymouth in September, sailing to Esquimalt for another overhaul.

Prince Robert recommissioned at Vancouver on 4 June 1945 and sailed for Sydney, Australia on 4 July via San Francisco. At San Francisco, the AA armament was altered, with four twin Oerlikon mounts replaced with four twin  Bofors gun mounts. In early August, Prince Robert joined the British Pacific Fleet. On 15 August, Japan surrendered and Prince Robert was part of Task Group 111.2 sent to secure Hong Kong from Japanese control. Upon arrival on 31 August, Prince Robert sent landing parties to secure the dock area, railyard and train station. Prince Roberts commander represented Canada at the formal surrender of Hong Kong to Allied forces on 16 September. Prince Roberts landing parties were replaced by Marine detachments from the battleship . Canadian prisoners of war from the units Prince Robert had ferried over to Hong Kong in 1941 were brought aboard the ship to be transported back to Canada. Prince Robert detached from the British Pacific Fleet and sailed for Esquimalt via Subic Bay and Manila. Prince Robert arrived at Esquimalt on 20 October and was paid off on 10 December 1945. The ship was transferred to the War Assets Corporation for disposal in January 1946 and laid up in Bedwell Bay, at the northern end of Burrard Inlet.

Commercial service and fate
War Assets sold Prince Robert to the Charlton Steam Shipping Company in 1947. The ship was reconverted to a passenger/cargo ship at Antwerp and renamed Charlton Sovereign. The conversion allowed them to carry 750 passengers in eight-berth cabins and 20 to 40-person dormitories. The ship was registered in London and re-entered service in 1948. In May 1948, Charlton Sovereign was chartered for use by the International Refugee Organization to transport displaced persons and refugees from Europe. In August, the ship sailed from Bremerhaven to Sydney, Australia, stopping for a month at Gibraltar to undergo engine repairs. The voyage took 86 days. Charlton Sovereign then made a voyage from Bremerhaven to Rio de Janeiro, Brazil, developing engine problems again. Upon return to Europe, the ship underwent two-month refit on the River Tyne. After returning to service, the vessel made trips from Naples, Italy to Rio de Janeiro, Naples to Halifax and Naples to Central America. The ship then sailed pilgrimage routes.

In 1951, the ship was acquired by Fratelli Grimaldi, renamed Lucania and  registered in Naples. Intended for the emigrant trade, in 1953, the ship underwent significant reconstruction, being lengthened to  overall and the gross register tonnage decreasing to 6,723 tons. The bow was lengthened and the funnels replaced and moved. Lucania could accommodate 90 first-class passengers, 90 intermediate and 560 tourist passengers. Sailing between Italy and Venezuela, Lucania remained in service until 1962. On 15 March 1962, Lucania was sold for scrap to G. Riccardi and broken up at Vado Ligure, near Livorno, Italy.

Notable passengers
The Czech-born artists Dusan and Voitre Marek travelled to Sydney from Germany as post-war immigrants to Australia, arriving in August 1948. They both created paintings in surrealist style along the way, some of which are now held by the Art Gallery of South Australia in Adelaide.

Citations

Sources

External links
 HMCS Prince Robert Tribute Site
 Prince class at hazegray.org
 The Prince-class vessels at the Commonwealth Air Training Plan Museum 

Ships of the Royal Canadian Navy
Cruisers of the Royal Canadian Navy
World War II cruisers of Canada
1930 ships
Steamships of Canada